, better known by his stage name Ryota, is a Japanese musician who is best known for being the bassist of the rock band One Ok Rock.

He was in the hip-hop dance group Heads along with Toru Yamashita (guitarist of One Ok Rock) before they disbanded in 2002.

Kohama is the brother-in-law of Canadian singer Avril Lavigne. He married her younger sister Michelle Lavigne, and they have a daughter together.

Personal life 
Kohama was born in Osaka before moving to Tokyo. Toru Yamashita, a fellow member from One Ok Rock, is his childhood friend. They met together with two other members: Takuya Makihara and Kohei Nakamura. They formed a hip-hop dance group HEADS when they were fifth and sixth graders. They were also active before their debut and participated in dance competitions around the years of 1995–1999. They debuted with a single titled "Screeeem!" in July 2000, and it was followed by the second single "Gooood or Bad!" in November, which was produced by a popular musician under the label Amuse, Inc. The dance group made a performance every weekend on the busy streets in Osaka's Kyoubashi and Tokyo's Akihabara, shopping, and amusement districts.

Heads disbanded in 2002 and in 2003 they took a break to improve their abilities. At this point, Heads as a four-member group ended. They merged into a new group with seven other members and were called Ground 0. In 2004, Toru and Ryota continued their activities as Ground 0. In 2005, when Toru tried to explore his acting and took a main role in TV series Shibuya Fifteen, Kohama also played in this drama as a minor character.

That same year, he was invited by Toru to form a rock band, alongside their upperclassman Alex and Toru's friend Koyanagi Yuu. In the beginning, Kohama initially had no interest in joining a band or playing bass, until he listened to Red Hot Chili Peppers and was inspired to play bass by Flea. During early days of One Ok Rock, Kohama only talked to Toru because he felt inferior and didn't talk to vocalist Takahiro Moriuchi for about a year because he was afraid of him. He was the most furious when Alex was caught groping a schoolgirl on a subway and almost quit playing bass to learn to play guitar. Kohama collaborated with drummer Tomoya Kanki and wrote the song "Deeper Deeper".

Since 2010, Kohama usually takes off his shirt when performing, mostly inspired by Flea of the Red Hot Chili Peppers and has a lot of tattoos on his body and arms. During English interviews with One Ok Rock, Taka accompanied Kohama to improve his English, since Taka is the best English speaker in the band.

On 18 February 2017, Ryota married Michelle Lavigne, the sister of Canadian singer-songwriter Avril Lavigne. It was rumoured that the couple had gotten married because during an encore at a concert, Taka said "Congrats on marriage, Ryota!" and Kohama replied saying "I registered for marriage this month! Her name is Michelle, please take care of us!"  Fans also noticed that Michelle had changed her name to Michelle Kohama on her Instagram account.
Kohama later confirmed on Instagram that he and Lavigne were married. In October 2017, he announced the birth of their first child, a girl.

Equipment 
Ryota has used many different basses, but he mostly uses Warwick basses. He has three Warwick Streamer LX4 and two Warwick Streamer LX5 with different color. Ryota prefers to play clean, but sometimes he adds distortion to his bassline, such like "Deeper Deeper" and "Rock, Scissor and Paper". He painted his amps with the help of a street artist.

See also 
 One Ok Rock discography

References

External links 

  
 Official Instagram

1989 births
Living people
People from Osaka
Musicians from Osaka
Japanese rock musicians
One Ok Rock members